Tom Gerety, a lawyer, philosopher, is the former president of both Trinity College (Connecticut) (1989-1994) and Amherst College (1994–2003).

Biography
After leaving Amherst College, he became the executive director of the Brennan Center for Justice (2003-2005) at New York University School of Law where he is now Collegiate Professor. He is the author of law review articles  and The Freshman Who Hated Socrates, a book on liberal arts education.

References

Presidents of Amherst College
New York University faculty
Living people
Year of birth missing (living people)
Presidents of Trinity College (Connecticut)
Yale Law School alumni